State Route 24 (SR 24) is an unsigned west–east state highway in Tennessee, as it coincides with U.S. Route 70 (and U.S. Route 70 Business in Lebanon) and U.S. Route 70N for its entire duration from Nashville to Crossville. The road begins in western Nashville (junction of Memphis-Bristol Highway and Charlotte Pike) and ends in Crossville (junction of West Avenue & Sparta Highway). It runs alongside Interstate 40 for its entire length.

There are no "Tennessee 24" signs along the route, although the designation can be seen on the route's mile markers.

Route description

Davidson County

SR 24 begins in Davidson County at an intersection with US 70/US 70S/SR 1 on the west side of Nashville. It goes east as the unsigned companion route of US 70 through a wooded area to an intersection with SR 251 (Old Hickory Boulevard). They continue east by some businesses before having an interchange with I-40 (Exit 201).  They continue east along Charlotte Avenue by some more businesses before having an with SR 155 (White Bridge Pike). They continue east to pass under the I-40/I-440 before having an interchange with I-40/I-65 (Exit 209). It then enters downtown and becomes the frontage roads for the Interstates before becoming concurrent with US 70S/US 431/SR 1 (Broadway) and going through downtown. They then come to an intersection with US 31/US 41/SR 11 (Rosa L. Parks Boulevard), where US 70S/US 431/SR 1 turn south to follow that route. It continues east along Broadway before turning southeast and running along the banks of the Cumberland River on 1st Avenue South, then on Hermitage Avenue. It then passes directly passes underneath the interchange between I-24/I-40. It then passes through an industrialized area before having an interchange with SR 155 (Briley Parkway, a freeway grade beltway around the north side of downtown) (Exit 8) before going through Donelson (along Lebanon Pike) and passing just north of Nashville International Airport, having an intersection with SR 255 (Donelson Pike). It then crosses over the Stones River and enters Hermitage. It then passes straight through downtown, having an intersection with SR 45 and SR 265, before passing The Hermitage, famous home of Andrew Jackson, the seventh president of the United States.

Wilson County

US 70/SR 24 then cross into Wilson County, leaving Hermitage and the Nashville area. It then passes through Green Hill and Mount Juliet, having an intersection with SR 171, before going through some countryside and having an interchange with SR 109 in Martha. It then goes through some more countryside before entering Lebanon. It passes by a few businesses before US 70 and SR 24 split at an intersection with SR 26 and US 70 Bus, with US 70 bypassing downtown to the north along SR 26 and SR 24 follows US 70 Bus through downtown. It then passes by some more businesses before going through some neighborhoods and entering downtown and having an intersection with US 231/SR 10 at an historic traffic circle and business district. It then becomes concurrent with SR 266 shortly afterwards, before going through some more neighborhoods before coming to an intersection with US 70/US 70N/SR 26/SR 141, with US 70 Bus and SR 266 ending and SR 24 continues east along US 70N. It then passes a few more businesses before leaving Lebanon and continuing through countryside.

Smith County

It then crosses into Smith County and starts paralleling the Cumberland River to pass through Rome and enter South Carthage. It then passes through downtown before coming to an interchange with SR 25 and SR 53, just across the river from downtown Carthage, the county seat. They then go east, concurrent with SR 53, through countryside as it leaves South Carthage and crosses the Caney Fork River before going through Elmwood and having an intersection with SR 264. It then leaves the Cumberland River, now Cordell Hull Lake, as it begins entering mountains and narrows and becomes curvy as it begins to cross over the Highland Rim. It then passes through Chestnut Mound, where SR 53 separates and turns north. It then rises in elevation, as it enters the Cumberland Plateau, and crosses into Putnam County.

Putnam County

It then has an intersection and becomes concurrent with SR 96 immediately afterwards, and goes east through some more mountains before SR 96 separates and goes north. The road then straightens out and widens as it enters Baxter and just north of town before coming to an intersection with SR 56. It then has an intersection with SR 291 in the Double Springs  community before entering Cookeville. It goes through some neighborhoods and passes by some businesses before entering downtown at an intersection with SR 135, which provides access to Tennessee Technological University (TTU). It then continues through downtown to have an intersection with SR 136 before leaving downtown and continuing through some more neighborhoods to an interchange with SR 111 before having an interchange with I-40 (Exit 290). It then leaves Cookeville and continues east through countryside. It then begins paralleling I-40 and goes through a large wooded area before coming to an intersection with SR 84 and becoming concurrent with it before having another interchange with I-40 (Exit 300), just before entering Monterey. Just before entering downtown, SR 84 separates and enters downtown, having an intersection with SR 62 a couple of blocks away. US 70N/SR 24 turns east and goes through a small neighborhoods before having another interchange with I-40 (Exit 301) before leaving Monterey and going through more countryside, paralleling and crossing under the interstate twice before entering Cumberland County.

Cumberland County

It continues through countryside and then farmland before entering Crossville at an intersection with the new SR 462 (Northwest Connector). They then pass by several businesses before coming to an intersection with US 70/SR 1 before turning east and going for 2 blocks before both US 70N/SR 24 both end at an intersection with US 127/SR 28 just north of downtown.

Major intersections

Landmarks
The following landmarks are visible from Tennessee 24:
Centennial Park in Nashville
Bridgestone Arena in Nashville
Ryman Auditorium in Nashville
Country Music Hall of Fame in Nashville
AT&T Building (formerly BellSouth Tower) in Nashville
Nissan Stadium in Nashville
The Cumberland River (several instances)
The Hermitage in Hermitage
The former Castle Heights Military Academy in Lebanon

See also
List of Tennessee state highways

References 

024
U.S. Route 70 
Transportation in Nashville, Tennessee 
Transportation in Davidson County, Tennessee 
Transportation in Wilson County, Tennessee 
Transportation in Smith County, Tennessee 
Transportation in Putnam County, Tennessee 
Transportation in Cumberland County, Tennessee